Adam Pagria or Adam Pagra (Mandaic: , bodily or physical Adam) in Mandaeism is the physical body of the primeval man and therefore of all humans. According to Mandaeism, all human bodies can be traced back to this primeval body. In contrast, Adam Kasia is the primeval soul of mankind.

The creator and uthra Ptahil, son of Abatur, created Adam Pagria with his helpers, the Seven Planets and the Twelve Zodiacs, from clay and other elements. With the help of Ruha, Ptahil gave Adam Pagria the spirit. Manda d-Hayyi and Hibil Ziwa gave the lightworld soul (Adam Kasia) to the body. Hawa (Eve) was then created as a companion for the first bodily Adam.

See also
Adam Kasia
Adam Ha-Rishon, the physical Adam in Judaism
Y-chromosomal Adam

References

Sources
 Drower, Ethel Stefana. The Secret Adam: A Study of Naṣoraean Gnosis. Clarendon Press, 1960.
 Drower, Ethel Stefana. The Mandaeans of Iraq and Iran: Their Cults, Customs, Magic Legends, and Folklore. Clarendon Press, 1937.

Mandaic words and phrases
Religious concepts related with Adam and Eve
Mythological first humans
Mandaean philosophical concepts